Eva Victor is an American comedian, writer, and actor.

Early life and education
Victor was born in Paris, but her family moved to San Francisco, where she grew up, when she was one. Victor went to a French-speaking high school, but was later switched to a nearby English-speaking one. She went to college at Northwestern University to study acting, with a minor in playwriting. Whilst there she took part in comedy as part of the improv team. After graduating, she gained representation after performing a dramatic acting showcase.

Career

Victor began working at feminist satire website Reductress as an intern. Victor later became an associate editor and staff writer at Reductress. She has written for the New Yorker's Daily Shouts section and has appeared on MTV's Decoded.

Victor works as an actress with the arts education organization Story Pirates, based in New York City.

Victor has received press for the videos she posts on Twitter that have gone viral. She performed some of these videos at a live event hosted by Buzzfeed in 2019. Victor also makes videos for Comedy Central.

Victor appears as Rian beginning in the fifth season of Billions and the first of Super Pumped as Susan Fowler on Showtime. In December 2019, Victor was cast in Jonah Feingold's directorial debut Dating and New York.

She is a member of the Democratic Socialists of America.

References

External links
 
 
 

Living people
Year of birth missing (living people)
American women comedians
Comedians from California
Members of the Democratic Socialists of America
Northwestern University alumni
21st-century American comedians
People from San Francisco
21st-century American women